Piotr Borys (born 11 January 1976) is a Polish politician, who has served as a local government official, member of the board and deputy marshal of the Lower Silesian Voivodeship, as Member of the Seventh European Parliament, and as member of the 9th Sejm.

Political career
In 2001 Borys graduated from the Faculty of Law and Administration at the University of Wrocław. Initially, he worked at the Arleg Regional Development Agency in Legnica, and from 2003 to 2006 he managed the joint-stock company Aquapark Polkowice. In from 1998 to 2002 Borys sat on the city council of Lubin. From 2003 he was the councilor of the Lower Silesian regional council. In the second term of office he was the deputy chairman of the regional council, then he was appointed to the voivodship board. He maintained this position after the local elections in 2006. In March 2008 he took the position of vice marshal in the new board. He belonged to the Freedom Union and the Democratic Party. In 2006 he moved to the Civic Platform. In 2001 he ran unsuccessfully for the Sejm and in 2004 for the European Parliament, and in 2005 for the Sejm again. In 2009 Borys ran for the European Parliament representative with the Civic Platform party for the Lower Silesia and Opole region, where he was elected an MEP (Member of European Parliament) for the 7th term. In the European Parliament he became a member of the delegation for relations with Afghanistan, the delegation for relations with Central Asia, the Committee on Legal Affairs and the Committee on Culture and Education. In 2014 he did not apply for re-election to the European parliament, and in 2015 unsuccessfully ran to the Senate of Poland under the banner of the Civic Platform. In 2018 he returned to the Lower Silesian regional council. In the 2019 Polish parliamentary election Boyrs was elected to be  9th term deputy of the Sejm in the Legnica constituency with 35,034 votes.

References

1976 births
Living people
People from Bolesławiec
University of Wrocław alumni
Civic Platform MEPs
Civic Platform politicians
Members of the Polish Sejm 2011–2015
Members of the Polish Sejm 2015–2019
Members of the Polish Sejm 2019–2023